AmazingPorts is a Linux-based software product customized for use as a  firewall, captive portal and billing system (Hotspots). The project started in 2001.

Description
AmazingPorts is mainly deployed as an access control system in private and public networks. It can be deployed as a single hotspot controller in airports, hotels, private locations and hospitals. It was used in Internet cafes in Europe by 2002 together with Intel. It was used for a city-wide Wi-Fi project in 2004, and Internet roaming in 2002.

AmazingPorts was created in 2001 with an initial vision of building free networks. Later the company refocused and provided its technology to network builders. The company implemented service-oriented provisioning in 2002 and was the first to implement 802.11a public hotspots in Europe. During 2009 and 2010 the administrative system was updated.

Features include:
 Firewall
 Service Oriented Provisioning
 NAT
 Distributed and/or centralised routing
 Fully customisable and language sensitive captive portal or any third party web page
 Dynamic Host Configuration Protocol (DHCP) server
 Integrated PayPal payments supporting many currencies
 Automatic currency updates from the European Central Bank
 Roles based Administration
 Seamless Roaming
 Compliance with the anti-terrorist Directive 2006/24/EC

References

External links
 AmazingPorts Home Page
 Full features list
 How to set up a hotspot
 Pricing strategies in hotspots
 Computer Sweden
 NyTeknik
 Internet ACTU
 CNET

Firewall software
Routing software
Gateway/routing/firewall distribution